This is a list of songs recorded by Indian male playback singer Vishal Dadlani.

Hindi songs

1999

2003

2004

2005

2006

2007

2008

2009

2010

2011

2012

2013

2014

2015

2016

2017

2018

2019

2020

2021

2022

2023

Other languages

Marathi songs

Kannada songs

Tamil songs

Telugu songs

Bengali songs

Gujarati songs

Malayalam songs

Punjabi songs

Nepali songs

Bhojpuri songs

References

Dadlani